Fotbal Club Botoșani is a Romanian professional football club based in Botoșani, Botoșani County, northeastern Romania. The club has only participated in two seasons of the UEFA Europa League thus far, more specifically in 2015–16 and then once more rather recently in 2020–21 UEFA Europa League. During both seasons it failed to qualify to the group stage and only played until the second qualifying round.

All-time statistics

Opponents

Matches 

Notes for the table below:

 1Q: First qualifying round
 2Q: Second qualifying round

External links
 

Romanian football clubs in international competitions
FC Botoșani